Andrew Stephens is an Australian rules football umpire currently officiating in the Australian Football League.

He first umpired in the AFL Brisbane Juniors as a teenager. He went on to umpire in the North East Australian Football League, officiating in the 2011, '12, and '13 Grand Finals. He was on the AFL umpiring rookie list for 2012 and 2013, and was added to the senior list in 2014. He made his AFL umpiring debut in Round 5 of that year, in a match between the Brisbane Lions and Richmond.

References

Living people
Australian Football League umpires
Year of birth missing (living people)